"Back to Sleep", also known by the censored version title "Sex You Back to Sleep", is a song by American recording artist Chris Brown from his seventh studio album Royalty. The song was released as the album's third single and its first urban single on November 5, 2015. Three official remixes of the song were released during the first months of 2016, one featuring Usher and ZAYN, another one featuring Miguel, August Alsina, and Trey Songz, and the last one featuring Tank, R. Kelly and Anthony Hamilton.

The song received universal acclaim from contemporary music critics, noting it as one of the album's highlights, celebrating its production and Brown's vocal performance. Some critics defined it as the best R&B song of its decade. The song received comparisons to Brown's previous singles "Take You Down" (2008) and "No Bullshit" (2011), and also to Marvin Gaye's 1982 song "Sexual Healing", for its similar musical direction. The song became the most successful one from the Royalty album, peaking at number 20 on the US Billboard Hot 100 and number 5 on the US Hot R&B/Hip-Hop Songs chart.

Its music video was released on December 14, 2015, and is part of Royalty music videos storyline, following the conclusion of Brown's "Fine by Me" music video. The videoclip displays an intimate sexual situation between Brown and his loved one.

Background 
The song was written by Chris Brown and August Rigo, and was produced by Vinylz and Boi-1da. The song was recorded during 2015 at Record Plant in Los Angeles, California. "Back to Sleep" was premiered via SoundCloud on November 5, 2015, and was sent to radio four days later as the album's third single, also receiving its commercial release for digital download on November 9, 2015.

Composition 

"Back to Sleep" is an R&B, mid-tempo slow jam about late night sex, that features beats and minor influences of funk, reminiscent of Marvin Gaye's 1982 song "Sexual Healing". The production of the song infuses elements of new school R&B with elements of '80s pop, and is based on roland TR-808 beats.

Brad Wete of Billboard analyzed its lyrical content by saying that "Brown stars, most likely, as himself -- fresh off a late night flight into town where, hopefully (but honestly, certainly) a beauty he’s yearning for will stay awake long enough for him to arrive at 3:30 a.m. so he too can be healed (“f--k”), then tuck her in for actual sleep. Chris wonders if she’ll leave him a spare key, but then cautions, “But if you keep the door unlocked, be ready”".

Music video 
On December 14, 2015, Brown uploaded the music video for "Back to Sleep" on his YouTube and Vevo account. The video begins after the conclusion of Brown's "Fine By Me" music video.

Synopsis
The music video for "Back to Sleep" was directed by Brown. The video begins, after the conclusion of Brown's "Fine by Me" music video, and starts with Brown making a call to his girlfriend, insisting that he come over even though it's late at night. After Brown and his girlfriend get intimate, showing them kissing and touching on display in the shower and bedroom. Intercut with performance clips where Brown sings the song in a club.

Live performances 
Brown promoted the song with live performances on televised shows and festivals, including Jimmy Kimmel Live!, Taraji & Terrence's White Hot Holidays, the "Lil' Weezyana Fest 2016", and the 3rd iHeartRadio Music Awards. The song was included on all the setlists of Brown's tours after its dropping.

Remixes 

Chris Brown has released three remixes to the song. Part 1 features Usher and ZAYN, and was released as "Back to Sleep (Remix)" on February 26, 2016; in addition to verses from Usher and ZAYN, the remix also features a new verse from Brown where he mentions his ex-girlfriend Karrueche Tran and cancels out the rest of the song except the chorus and bridge. Part 2 features Miguel, August Alsina, and Trey Songz, and was released as "Back to Sleep (Remix)" on April 8, while Part 3 was released on April 10 as "Back To Sleep (Legends Remix)", and features Tank, R. Kelly and Anthony Hamilton. On August 29, 2016, R&B singer Brandy shared a version of the song with Brown. On July 15, 2016, another remix version was released, titled "Secret Garden Remix". The song featured previously released verses from R. Kelly, Usher, Tank, and an additional verse from fellow R&B singer and actor Tyrese Gibson

Critical reception 
"Back to Sleep" received widespread acclaim from music critics. The co-host of The Breakfast Club, Charlamagne tha God, defined the song as "the best R&B record in the past 15 years" along with "Adorn" by Miguel. AllMusic editor Andy Kellman said that the song is the best one out of Royalty. Brad Wete of Billboard said that the song "excels as a quality addition to his catalog’s stellar collection of panty-dropping and baby-making songs", comparing the song to Brown's previous singles "Take You Down" (2008) and "No Bullshit" (2011), and also to Marvin Gaye's 1982 song "Sexual Healing". Mikael Wood of The Courier-Journal praised the "great vocal performance" of Brown, and called "Back to Sleep" "a smooth depiction of genuine sexuality".

Chart performance 
On the Billboard Hot 100, the song debuted at number 64 on the week ending January 2, 2016, and reached number 48 on the week ending February 13, 2016. On the week ending March 12, 2016, it reached number 36 on the Hot 100, and number 2 on the Mainstream R&B/Hip-Hop chart. On the week ending March 19, 2016, it reached number 20 on the Hot 100 and became the top Digital Gainer of the week, debuting at number 13 on the Digital Songs chart, having sold 42,000 downloads that week, 32% of which stemmed from the Part 1 remix. The same week, it reached number 5 on the Hot R&B/Hip-Hop Songs chart, number 2 on the R&B Digital Songs chart, and number 3 on the Hot R&B Songs chart. By April 2, 2016, the single had sold 300,620 copies in the US.

Track listing 
Digital download
"Back to Sleep" (Explicit) – 3:21
Digital download (Remix)
"Back to Sleep" (Remix)  – 4:27
Digital download (Legends Remix)
"Back to Sleep" (Legends Remix)  – 3:43

Charts

Weekly charts

Year-end charts

Certifications

References 

2015 singles
2015 songs
Songs about sleep
Chris Brown songs
RCA Records singles
Songs written by Chris Brown
Song recordings produced by Boi-1da
Song recordings produced by Vinylz
Usher (musician) songs
Miguel (singer) songs
August Alsina songs
Tyrese Gibson songs
Tank (American singer) songs
Trey Songz songs
Zayn Malik songs
Songs written by Boi-1da
Songs written by Vinylz
Songs written by August Rigo
Songs written by Allen Ritter
Song recordings produced by Allen Ritter